R K Puram Assembly constituency is one of the seventy Delhi assembly constituencies of Delhi in northern India. It is a part of New Delhi (Lok Sabha constituency).

Members of Legislative Assembly

Election results

2020

2015

2013

2008

2003

1998

1993

References

Assembly constituencies of Delhi
Delhi Legislative Assembly